Marin Draganja and Henri Kontinen were the defending champions, but Draganja chose to compete in Bucharest instead. Kontinen played alongside John Peers, but lost in the first round to Jamie Murray and Bruno Soares. 
Bob and Mike Bryan won the title, defeating Pablo Cuevas and Marcel Granollers in the final, 7–5, 7–5.

Seeds

Draw

Draw

Qualifying

Seeds

Qualifiers
  Oliver Marach /  Fabrice Martin

Qualifying draw

References
 Main Draw
 Qualifying Draw

Barcelona Open Banco Sabadell - Doubles